The Hunter 25.5 is an American sailboat that was designed by Cortland Steck and first built in 1984.

Production
The design was built by Hunter Marine in the United States between 1984 and 1987, but it is now out of production.

Design
The Hunter 25.5 is a recreational keelboat, built predominantly of fiberglass, with wood trim. It has a masthead sloop rig, a raked stem, a vertical transom, a transom-hung rudder controlled by a tiller and a fixed fin keel. It displaces  and carries  of ballast.

The boat is normally fitted with a small outboard motor for docking and maneuvering.

The fin keel version of the design has a PHRF racing average handicap of 210 with a high of 204 and low of 231. The wing keel version has a PHRF racing average handicap of 213 with a high of 198 and low of 234.

See also
List of sailing boat types

Similar sailboats
Beachcomber 25
Bayfield 25
Bombardier 7.6
Cal 25
Cal 2-25
C&C 25
Capri 25
Catalina 25
Catalina 250
Com-Pac 25
Dufour 1800
Freedom 25
Jouët 760
Kelt 7.6
Kirby 25
MacGregor 25
Merit 25
Mirage 25
Northern 25
O'Day 25
Redline 25
Sirius 26
Tanzer 25
US Yachts US 25
Watkins 25

References

Keelboats
1980s sailboat type designs
Sailing yachts
Sailboat type designs by Cortland Steck
Sailboat types built by Hunter Marine